Still Crooked is the third album by progressive bluegrass group Crooked Still. At the end of 2007 Rushad Eggleston parted ways with the group and was replaced by Tristan Clarridge, cellist of Darol Anger's Republic of Strings. Brittany Haas, 5-string fiddler of the same group, was added to the Crooked Still lineup as well.

Track list
 Undone in Sorrow (Reed) 3:05
 The Absentee (trad.) 2:27
 Captain, Captain (trad.) 2:42
 Tell Her to Come Back Home (Macon, trad.) 2:57
 Low Down and Dirty (O'Donovan) 4:07
 Oh, Agamemnon (Haas, O'Donovan) 4:04
 Pharaoh (trad.) 4:42
 Florence (Carter) 3:28
 Did You Sleep Well? (Taylor) 4:07
 Poor Ellen Smith (trad.) 2:44
 Theme From The Absentee (Liszt) 0:24
 Wading Deep Waters (trad.) 4:12
 Baby, What's Wrong With You? (Hurt) 5:10

Personnel 
 Aoife O'Donovan - vocals
 Gregory Liszt - banjo
 Tristan Clarridge - violoncello
 Corey DiMario - upright bass
 Brittany Haas - 5-string fiddle, vocals

References

External links
Album lyrics
Official website

2008 albums
Crooked Still albums